Kimbe is the capital of the province of West New Britain in Papua New Guinea, and the largest settlement on the island. The bustling town of Kimbe is the third largest port in Papua New Guinea and is the fastest growing city in the South Pacific. The town of Kimbe is served by Hoskins Airport.

The town is administered under Kimbe Urban LLG in West New Britain Province.

Industry
Kimbe town is the center of many industries, including palm oil, cocoa, logging and coconut plantations. Many of these products are shipped out using Kimbe's main port.
The biggest industry in West New Britain and Papua New Guinea itself is called New Britain Palm Oil Limited, or NBPOL, which is also the owner of Ramu Agriculture. The company grows oil palm and then uses the fruit to create palm oil which is used in cooking oil, shampoo, soap, body products, moisturisers and many other products. The oil is produced by 4 oil mills and 1 refinery. The names of the mills are Mosa Oil Mill, Kumbanga Oil Mill, Numundo Oil Mill, Kapiura Oil Mill, Kumbungo Kernal Mill and Kumbungo Oil Refinery.
The company also has a cattle station which is used as food for the region.
The employees of the company are not only paid but are served with free electricity, water, TV and housing.

Climate
Kimbe has a tropical rainforest climate (Köppen Af) with heavy rainfall year-round.

Education
Schools located in Kimbe include:

Kimbe International School
Mora Mora Technical School
Kimbe Secondary school
Hoskins Secondary School
New Tribes Mission
Mahonia Na Dari marine education program
New Britain International School (owned by NBPOL)
International Training Institute

References

Populated coastal places in Papua New Guinea
Port cities in Oceania
Populated places in West New Britain Province
Provincial capitals in Papua New Guinea